Vice Admiral Charles Frederick Schomberg (b. abt 1815, d.29 September 1874), was an officer of the British Royal Navy. He was the eldest son of Admiral Alexander Wilmot Schomberg by his second marriage.

The ship , was named after him. She was built in Aberdeen, and sank on her maiden voyage; from Liverpool to Australia in 1855 off the Shipwreck Coast, Peterborough, Victoria. When she was launched she was the largest vessel ever built in the United Kingdom.

Career
Schomberg entered the navy from the Royal Naval College on 16 May 1829 with the rank of midshipman, passing his examination for lieutenant in 1833, but not obtaining his commission until 28 June 1838. On 13 July he was appointed to the ship  under the command of Captain John Lawrence, to serve in the Mediterranean. There he took part in the operations of 1840 on the coast of Syria, and on the night of 1 October served in the boats under Commander Henry John Worth, at the destruction of a train laid to one of the castles at Beyrout, and the capture there of 31 barrels of powder.

On 3 February 1841, he was appointed senior lieutenant of the steam frigate , under Captain Horatio Thomas Austin. In November 1843 he moved with Captain Austin, as additional lieutenant, to the steam gunboat , and on 10 February 1844 he was promoted to commander.

From 7 January 1848, he moved into , flagship of Vice Admiral the Earl of Dundonald on the North America and West Indies Station.

Schomberg took over command of Trafalgar and was with her until March 1865.

He had no further active service, but was promoted to rear-admiral on the retired list on 24 May 1867, and then to vice-admiral on 29 May 1873. Charles Schomberg died at Holyhead on 1 October 1874.

Personal life
Schomberg was born in RNH Stonehouse, Plymouth and married in 1848 to Helen Hartshorne in Halifax, Nova Scotia. They had 3 daughters.

References

1874 deaths
Royal Navy personnel of the Egyptian–Ottoman War (1839–1841)
Royal Navy admirals
1815 births